The National Library Sheikh Isa bin Salman Al Khalifa is the national library for Bahrain

, and it undertakes the task of legal deposit in the country. It contains a variety of resources and provides many services. It was opened on the 18th December 2008.

Functions 
The Bahraini National Library is working to accomplish the following functions:

 Encouraging reading, research, reading and providing advanced library services to all beneficiaries.
 Collecting and preserving the national intellectual production in its various forms and informing about it through the issuance of national bibliographies, and working to deposit it in the library.
 Collecting and preserving manuscripts, documents, rare books and government publications in all its forms.
 Providing various sources of knowledge in all its forms
 Develop the exchange of publications with national libraries and other information centers.

References

External links 

 

National libraries